The following is a partial list of sailboat types and sailing classes, including keelboats, dinghies and multihull (catamarans and trimarans).

Olympic classes

World Sailing Classes

Historically known as the IYRU (International Yacht Racing Union), the organization evolved into the ISAF (International Sailing Federation) in 1996, and as of December 2015 is now World Sailing.

Dinghies

Keelboats & yachts

Multihulls

Boards

Radio-controlled

Former World Sailing-classes

Dinghies

Keelboats & yachts

Multihulls

Boards

Other classes and sailboat types

Dinghies

Keelboats & yachts

Multihulls

See also
 Classic dinghy classes
 List of boat types
 List of historical ship types
 List of keelboat classes designed before 1970
 Olympic sailing classes
 Small-craft sailing
 Clansman 30

Notes

References

 Types

Boat types
Lists of watercraft types